Kenston High School is a public high school located in Bainbridge Township, Ohio, near Chagrin Falls. It serves most of Bainbridge Township and all of neighboring Auburn Township and is the only high school in the Kenston Local School District.  Kenston High School was established in 1953 with the consolidation of the Auburn and Bainbridge Township schools and moved to its current facility in August 2006. Academics include a wide array of courses and it fields numerous boys and girls sports teams. Athletic teams are known as the Bombers and the school colors are blue and white.

History

Kenston High School developed out the now defunct Bainbridge High School in the mid-twentieth century.  At its inception it was a vocational school, similar to the nearby Auburn Career Center of today, but eventually evolved into a four-year academic high school. In 2006 the high school was moved from the current middle school to where it is now.

Athletics
Kenston athletic teams are known as the Bombers, inspired by the B-25 bombers which used to fly over the school from the nearby Ravenna Arsenal. The school logo most commonly used is of a B-52 bomber, which is also shown on the school's website.

State championships

 Boys cross country - 1983  
 Boys' Football - 2018
 Wrestling – 1972 
 Boys soccer – 1987

Notable alumni

 Jack Rudnay (1965), former professional American football player with the Kansas City Chiefs of the National Football League (NFL)
 Tyson Walter, former professional football player in the NFL
 Justin Herdman, current US Attorney for the Northern District of Ohio
 Scott Weiland, former Stone Temple Pilots vocalist

References

External links 
 Kenston High School website
 Kenston Local School District

High schools in Geauga County, Ohio
Public high schools in Ohio
Educational institutions established in 1953
1953 establishments in Ohio